Storm the Streets is the second studio album by the American punk rock band the Riverdales. After a dispute with Lookout! Records, the band signed to Honest Don's Records for this release. It is the only Riverdales album still available from its original label. In the liner notes to Screeching Weasel's Thank You Very Little, Ben Weasel refers to Storm the Streets as a "gem" but admits that the record sold far less than its predecessor, Riverdales. The band broke up after the album's release until they reunited in 2003 to record and release Phase Three. "I Accuse My Parents" most likely takes its title from a movie of the same name which was featured on Mystery Science Theater 3000, a television show mentioned in the song "I Think About You During the Commercials" from the Riverdales' debut album. The album was mixed from February 24–27, 1997 by Mass Giorgini at Sonic Iguana Studios in Lafayette, Indiana.

Storm the Streets was remastered and reissued in 2011 on Fat Wreck Chords.

Track listing
All songs written by Ben Foster and Dan Schafer.

"Make Way" - 1:58
"Mental Retard" - 2:51
"Don't Let Them Beat My Baby" - 2:32
"Cementhead" - 1:43
"Riverdale Stomp" - 2:14
"Dyna-Mole" - 2:12
"I Will Make It Up to You" - 3:08
"Blood on the Ice" - 2:09
"I Don't Wanna Go to the Party" - 2:20
"Kick Your Head In" - 2:55
"I Accuse My Parents" - 2:24
"Boy in the Plastic Bubble" - 1:50
"Give It Up" - 2:15
"I Am Not a Freak" - 1:28

Personnel
Riverdales
 Ben Foster - guitar, lead vocals
 Dan Schafer - bass, lead vocals
 Dan Sullivan - drums, backing vocals

Production
 Mass Giorgini - producer, engineer
 Ben Foster - producer
 Tom Baker - mastering
 Tim Carlson - band portrait
 Fryderyk Garbowicz - photography

References

1997 albums
Riverdales albums
Honest Don's Records albums
Fat Wreck Chords albums